Canyon View High School (also known as CV and CVHS) was established in 1997 in Cedar City, Utah. Its mascot is the Falcon. The school colors are black, silver, and teal. It has approximately 1,000 students and 50 faculty members.  Its current principal is Dennis Heaton. The assistant principal is Julie King.

This school is in Iron County School District, Region 9, and is a 4A school.

History
Not knowing the future growth of the school, in 1999 the Iron County School District released that they were building a new Canyon View High School building just across the street from the already newly built school.  In the fall of 2000, students were finally able to enter the current building of Canyon View.

Boundaries
Canyon View High School boundaries currently include the northern half of Cedar City, as well as Enoch, Newcastle, Beryl, and other parts of Iron County.

Notable alumni
Mitch Talbot - MLB pitcher
Shayne Smith (comedian) - Stand-up comedian

References

External links

 

Public high schools in Utah
Educational institutions established in 1997
Schools in Iron County, Utah
Buildings and structures in Cedar City, Utah
1997 establishments in Utah